Bloomington Township is one of twelve townships in Buchanan County, Missouri, USA.  As of the 2010 census, its population was 674.

Bloomington Township was organized in 1839; the name Bloomington is an old variant name of De Kalb.

Geography
It contains two cemeteries: Jones and West Lawn.

The stream of South Sugar Creek runs through this township.

References

External links
 US-Counties.com
 City-Data.com
 USGS Geographic Names Information System (GNIS)

Townships in Buchanan County, Missouri
Townships in Missouri